The National Gallery Act 1856 of the United Kingdom Parliament related to the National Gallery and Tate gallery in London, England, with respect to the sale of works of art by the trustees.

References

1856 in London
United Kingdom Acts of Parliament 1856
Acts of the Parliament of the United Kingdom concerning museums
Acts of the Parliament of the United Kingdom concerning London
National Gallery, London
Tate galleries